Brad Mays (born May 30, 1955) is an independent filmmaker and stage director, living and working in Los Angeles, California.

Background and education
Mays was raised in the Edinburg section of West Windsor Township, New Jersey, attending the local public schools before going to Princeton High School.

During the early 1970s, Mays became involved in the performing arts during a professional internship at the McCarter Theater in Princeton, New Jersey. When his family moved  to Maryland in the wake of difficulties resulting from his participation in anti-war demonstrations, Mays became heavily involved in the Baltimore experimental theater scene and, at the age of eighteen, began directing at the Corner Theatre ETC.

Upon completion of theatre arts studies at Towson University, Mays was formally hired by the Baltimore Theatre Project. In 1982, Mays  moved to New York City, where he began working off-Broadway and, ultimately, produced and directed his first independent feature film, Stage Fright.

Film work
In 2006, Mays filmed the documentary feature SING*ularity (2008),  which explores the cutting-edge training of classical singers at the world-renowned OperaWorks program in Southern California.  Other films include a free-form adaptation of  Euripides' The Bacchae (2002), and his first feature, Stage Fright, a semi-autobiographical piece, co-written with his friend and fellow Corner Theatre alum, Stanley Keyes, which depicts the trials and tribulations of a late '60's theatre company and had its inaugural screenings at the 1989 Berlin International Film Festival under the auspices of American Independents In Berlin and the New York Foundation for the Arts. It was during the editing of that particular project that Mays was invited to participate as a segment director on Howard Stern's first Pay-Per-View special, Howard Stern's Negligee and Underpants Party.

Mays' 2008 motion picture romantic comedy The Watermelon premiered at the San Diego Film Festival, where it quickly achieved the top slot for audience and industry buzz.  Written by Michael Hemmingson, The Watermelon was produced by Lorenda Starfelt at LightSong Films in North Hollywood, and was conceived as a "Fairy Tale for grown-ups." The film stars Will Beinbrink, Kiersten Morgan, Elyse Ashton, Julia Aks, Mike Ivy and Bob Golub. The Watermelon was released by Celebrity Video Distribution, a Los Angeles distribution company dedicated to serving the independent film community. It was subsequently awarded a 2010 California Film Awards "Diamond Award."

In 2009, Brad Mays finished work on the feature-length political documentary The Audacity of Democracy, which followed the 2008 race for the Democratic Presidential Nomination and focused in particular on the notorious PUMA movement. In multiple Blog-Radio interviews,<ref>[http://www.politicsdaily.com/2009/01/31/puma-movie-director-on-unusable-signal-tonight/ Politics Daily online article, written by Tommy Christopher, discussing Brad Mays' film The Audacity of Democracy]</ref> the director expressed dissatisfaction with the project, revealing that he had not been allowed to complete shooting in the manner originally agreed to. On June 6, 2011, Brad Mays discussed his personal and working relationship with his late wife Lorenda Starfelt – who had died of uterine cancer earlier that year – with blog radio host John Smart. In the interview, which Smart described on his website as "harsh, truthful and brutally honest," Mays revealed the closeness of his artistic collaboration with Starfelt, as well as his reasons for considering their 2010 documentary film co-production The Audacity of Democracy to have been "unsuccessful...incomplete, inconclusive, ultimately unsatisfying and even embarrassing." In June 2012, Mays' comedy short The Donut Shop received the "People's Choice Award" at the San Francisco Black Film Festival, as well as "Best Comedy" at the 2012 San Diego Black Film Festival.

The following year, Mays' feature documentary I Grew Up in Princeton had its premiere showing in Princeton, New Jersey. The film, described in one Princeton newspaper as a "deeply personal 'coming-of-age story' that yields perspective on the role of perception in a town that was split racially, economically and sociologically", is a portrayal of life in the venerable university town during the tumultuous period of the late sixties through the early seventies. Featuring interviews with over 60 artists, political activists, educators, historians, musicians and others, the film deals with the town's past struggles with racism, political unrest and the still-controversial shutdown of the Institute for Defense Analysis (IDA) during the anti-Vietnam War student strike - both university and high school - in the days immediately following the Kent State shootings of 1970.

On March 17, 2016, Mays premiered the self-described "bleak little comedy about falling in hate," Road Rage, at The Garden theater in Princeton, New Jersey. Shot for the most part in and around Princeton, the film tells the story of Matt Lipton (Adam Roth), a widowed man in his early 60s who enters into a misbegotten romantic relationship with a pretentious would-be "townie" named Missy Taylor (Kristin Jann-Fischer). The two embark on a road trip into the deep South, with disastrous consequences. The film can be seen as an expression of Mays' continuing yearning for his beloved hometown, as well as for the loss of his wife, Lorenda, to cancer. “I was able to flesh out the deceased wife’s character to a degree that would have been otherwise impossible,” Mays says in an article for the Princeton Packet. “For instance, Lori had always wanted to be an opera singer. I was able to fulfill that dream for her in the movie, and tie it in with the narrative in a way that I find very satisfying.” 
Ironically, the film's star Adam Roth also succumbed to cancer in the final stages of production, necessitating extensive rewrites and additional shooting. Roth, an extremely popular guitarist/composer in New York's hard rock scene, grew up in Princeton, and had worked extensively in that town's professional and community theater scene during the 1970s. ”Actually, when he was young, Adam did a lot of acting while his family lived in Princeton — at the high school and at McCarter Theater,” Mays said to journalist Sally Stang just before his film's premiere. “Even back then the word ‘genius’ was tossed around. Adam was something else... right up to the end.”  In the days leading up to the film's premiere and New York screenings, Mays and partner/co-producer Barbara Curtis appeared on several radio and television shows, discussing the themes of Road Rage, as well as the challenges in getting it from script to the screen.

In March of 2018, Brad Mays' 14 minute short film, "Aiden's Butterflies," had its premiere screening at the Princeton Environmental Film Festival, with a subsequent screening at the Paradigm Shifts Film and Music Festival in NYC."Aiden's Butterflies" is a short film about a young New Jersey boy, Aiden Wang, who has developed a deep love and understanding of Monarch Butterflies, an endangered species. The film was produced by Olga Taylan for the Environmental Education Fund, and features Yuki Azumi, Frances Catherine Ihlng, Adrian Hyde, and Trina Paulus. "Aiden's Butterflies" has since become a staple of environmental film festivals around the world.

In 2019, Brad Mays completed work on Two Trentons: An American City Speaks. As the title suggests, the documentary feature is a portrait of a city "at war with itself," as the director stated in an August, 2019 interview in New Jersey Stage. Having premiered on September 15, 2019 at the New Jersey International Film Festival, Two Trentons presents a broad view of the city, and includes interviews with artists, musicians, activists, city planners, mental health professionals, architects, and non profit workers. There is also footage of the notorious "Art All Night" gang shooting, as well as its aftermath. According to the film's IMdB listing: "Two Trentons" is a hard-hitting look at a city desperate to redefine itself - through art, music, education, and prison reform - from its all-too-familiar image as a blighted, urban lost cause of decay, violence, hopelessness and moral decline. Featuring numerous interviews with city planners, clergymen, scientists, mental health professionals, artists, musicians, educators, and non-profit volunteers, the experiences of the people who live, work and struggle in Trenton are movingly expressed with eloquence and urgency." The film subsequently won the "Best Documentary - Honorable Mention Award" at that festival,

 and was subsequently invited to be featured in other film festivals, including the "Garden State Film Festival" and the "New York City Indie Film Festival". 
 Another feature documentary, Jubilate Trego: The Choral Legacy of William Trego, was accepted as an official selection by the 7th Music Film Festival in Buenos Aires, Argentina in November 2022.

In 2020, Mays directed the experimental music video Leviathan, for Detroit producer Blake Harrington, and worked as cinematographer for the educational film The Rags of Time: J. Robert Oppenheimer for director Patricia Robinson-Linder. More recently, Mays spent 18 months working on 3 Degrees of Connection, a feature documentary film which explores the environmental, racial, and other social challenges of Lewes, Delaware. An early newspaper article about the film described it as "a cautionary tale vividly told through the eyes of the town’s residents and business owners, educators and elected officials, both old-timers and newcomers. All explore some aspect of the town’s past, present and future."   On September 16, 2022, the Global Nonviolent Film Festival  announced the inclusion of both Two Trentons: An American City Speaks and 3 Degrees of Connection as official selections in their 11th annual film competition. 
 On the day of its screening, festival co-founder Bruno Pischiutta, in his televised introduction, referred to Brad Mays as "the best documentary director in the United States". The festival's jury ultimately awarded Mays with "Best Director of a Feature Documentary" for Two Trentons - An American City Speaks.  Global Cinema has also selected the film for world-wide distribution.  The Seaside Sustainability Film Festival of Gloucester, Massachusetts also featured 3 Degrees of Connection as an Official Selection in their first annual presentation.

Stage work
Brad Mays has directed for the stage, primarily in Baltimore, New York and Los Angeles. His first New York production was an evening of one-act plays, written by Linda Chambers and performed at the Cubiculo Theatre: Joan, Stones, and Requiem.  All three pieces dealt with themes of personal spirituality. Requiem, the longest play of the evening, was a fictionalized drama about the death of Irish hunger striker Bobby Sands, and performed during the Saint Patrick's Day holiday in 1982. Mays' Off-Broadway presentation of Stanisław Ignacy Witkiewicz's The Water Hen,  was videotaped by the Lincoln Center's Billy Rose Theatre Collection for inclusion in their permanent archive.

In Los Angeles, Mays' original adaptation of Euripides' The Bacchae was nominated for three LA Weekly Theatre Awards (including Best Direction) in 1997  and also videotaped for the Lincoln Center's archive. The production was recognized for its overall directorial audacity, the movement-scoring work by choreographer Kim Weild, and for its aggressive onstage violence and nudity. Mays' multi-media production of Anthony Burgess' A Clockwork Orange, performed in Los Angeles at the ARK Theatre company, was likewise nominated for Best Direction, Best Revival Production, and Best Actress by the 2004 LA Weekly Theater Awards. Vanessa Claire Smith won Best Actress for her gender-bending portrayal of Alex, the story's protagonist. In 2021, Mays' production was included in the Anthony Burgess estate's official online overview of stage productions of "A Clockwork Orange" from around the world.

Other efforts include Peter Weiss' The Persecution and Assassination of Jean-Paul Marat as Performed by the Inmates of the Asylum of Charenton Under the Direction of the Marquis de Sade  at Theatre of NOTE in Los Angeles;  an expanded version of Joan by Linda Chambers, starring Rain Pryor as Joan of Arc; and the black comedy Dragon Slayers, by Stanley Keyes, in which a cult of insane puppeteers engage in ritual murder. Dragon Slayers was performed in both New York and Los Angeles over a period of several years, featuring an original electronic score contributed by Garth Hudson of the late sixties rock group The Band.

In 2022, Brad Mays returned to the theater following an 18 year hiatus when he agreed to direct the New York premiere of I Babysat Jesus, a one-woman show written by and starring Mary Elizabeth Barrett.

Other work

Brad Mays was invited to discuss Euripides' The Bacchae for WGBH Boston's 2010 PBS series Invitation to World Literature,'' which was also launched on Annenberg Media's educational website in September, 2010. Also featured on the show were Nobel Prize winner Wole Soyinka, director Richard Schechner, and actor Alan Cumming.

Selected filmography

References

External links

Streaming video of Brad Mays' films on MOORvision 
Brad Mays Vimeo Page 
Official Website
CNN clip of director Brad Mays remembering Paul Newman at the 2008 San Diego Film Festival.
CNN article about the death of Paul Newman, in which director Brad Mays discusses an encounter with the iconic actor. 

American theatre directors
American film editors
People from West Windsor, New Jersey
Princeton High School (New Jersey) alumni
Towson University alumni
Living people
1955 births
Film directors from New Jersey